Men's Judo

Alexandru Lungu (born 3 September 1974) is a Romanian professional mixed martial artist, kickboxer and judoka. Lungu has most recently competed in the Super Heavyweight division of MMA. A professional competitor since 2005, Lungu has formerly competed for the PRIDE Fighting Championships, Cage Rage, and K-1, for both MMA and professional kickboxing.

Judo career
A successful judoka, Lungu won several judo tournaments across Europe, including the Romanian Cup in 2004 and the International Tournament Monaco in 2005. Lungu competed in judo from 1991 until 2005.

Mixed martial arts career

PRIDE Fighting Championships
Lungu made his professional MMA debut on October 23, 2005 at PRIDE 30 against James Thompson, in a Super Heavyweight bout, Lungu weighed in at 368 lbs. and knocked Thompson down in the early seconds of round one, but seemed to fatigue upon standing up and lost via TKO at 2:13 of the first round.

Cage Rage
Lungu picked up a win in his next fight a year later on September 30, 2006 at Cage Rage 18 against Mark Buchanan via submission (kimura) in the first round.

Independent promotions
Lungu returned to Romania to continue competing and has compiled a record of 9-2 since PRIDE and Cage Rage.

Lungu defeated Mighty Mo via knockout in the first round on December 15, 2014 in an Open Weight bout.

Lungu is next scheduled to face Jeff Monson on June 15, 2015 at RXF 18.

Kickboxing career
Lungu made his professional kickboxing debut for SUPERKOMBAT on October 15, 2011, against Bob Sapp. Lungu won via knockout in the first round and has since compiled a professional kickboxing record of 4-1 for the promotion, most recently picking up a win over Mike Bourke on December 21, 2013 via first round knockout.

Championships and accomplishments

Kickboxing
SUPERKOMBAT Fighting Championship 
 2011 SUPERKOMBAT Fight of the Year (vs. Bob Sapp)

Kickboxing record

|-
|-
| 
|Win
| Vincent Liebregts
| Colosseum Tournament 29
| Arad, Romania
| TKO (three knockdowns)
|align=center|2
|align=center|2:55
| align=center|15–2
| 
|-
| 
|Win
| Adnan Alić
| Colosseum Tournament 27
| Oradea, Romania
| Decision (unanimous)
|align=center|3
|align=center|3:00
| align=center|14–2
| 
|-
| 
|Win
| Franco De Martiis	
| Colosseum Tournament 25
| Cluj-Napoca, Romania
| Decision (unanimous)
|align=center|3
|align=center|3:00
| align=center|13–2
| 
|-
| 
|Win
| Tamás Hajdu 
| Colosseum Tournament 19
| Debrecen, Hungary
| TKO (referee stoppage) 
|align=center|1
|align=center|1:43
| align=center|12–2
| 
|-
| 
|Win
| Satisch Jhamai
| Colosseum Tournament 15
| Oradea, Romania
| KO (punches flurry)
|align=center|2
|align=center|2:25
| align=center|11–2
| 
|-
| 
|Win
| Zoltán Enyedi 
| Colosseum Tournament 12
| Arad, Romania
| KO (left hook) 
|align=center|2
|align=center|0:20
| align=center|10–2
| 
|-
| 
|Win
| Fredi Gonzales
| KO Masters 1
| Bucharest, Romania
| TKO (referee stoppage)
|align=center|1
|align=center|1:30
| align=center|9–2
| 
|-  
|
| Loss
| Yassine Boughanem
|Best of Siam 11
|Paris, France
| KO (strikes)
|align="center"| 1
|align="center"| 
| 8-2
| 
|-
|
| Win
| Mike Bourke
|SUPERKOMBAT World Grand Prix 2013 Final
|Galați, Romania
| KO (strikes)
|align="center"| 1
|align="center"| 1:25
| 8-1
| 
|-
|
| Loss
| Jason Dutton
|SUPERKOMBAT World Grand Prix I 2013
|Oradea, Romania
| DQ (strikes on a downed opponent)
|align="center"| 1
|align="center"| 3:00
| 7-1
| 
|-
|
|Win
| Deutsch Pu'u
|SUPERKOMBAT World Grand Prix IV 2012
|Arad, Romania
|KO (punch)
|align="center"|2
|align="center"|1:42
|7-0
| 
|-
|
|Win
| Wiesław Kwaśniewski
|SUPERKOMBAT World Grand Prix II 2012
|Cluj Napoca, Romania
|Decision (split)
|align="center"|3
|align="center"|3:00
|6-0
| 
|-
|
|Win
| Neil Cooke
|SUPERKOMBAT Fight Club
|Oradea, Romania
|KO (punches)
|align="center"|1
|align="center"|0:50
|5-0
| 
|-
|
|Win
| Bob Sapp
|SUPERKOMBAT World Grand Prix IV 2011
|Piatra Neamț, Romania
|KO (left hook)
|align="center"|1
|align="center"|1:11
|4-0
| 
|-
|-
| colspan=10| Legend:

Mixed martial arts record 

|- 
|Win
| align=center|19–5
| Fredi Gonzales
| TKO (punches)
| Fight Zone 9
| 
|align=center|1
|align=center|0:34
| Deva, Romania
| 
|- 
|Win
| align=center|18–5
| Florin Dănilă
| TKO (leg injury)
| Heroes Fight League 5
| 
|align=center|1
|align=center|1:26
| Mioveni, Romania
| 
|- 
|Win
| align=center|17–5
| Peter Balaž 
|Submission (smother)
| RXF 31
| 
|align=center|1
|align=center|3:05
| Cluj-Napoca, Romania
| 
|-
|Loss
| align=center|16–5
| Chris Barnett
|KO (punches)
| Road FC 047
| 
|align=center|1
|align=center|2:34
| Beijing, China
| Road FC 2018 Openweight Grand Prix
|-
|Win
| align=center|16–4
| Adnan Alić 
|TKO (punches)
| RXF 29: All Stars
| 
|align=center|1
|align=center|1:12
| Brasov, Romania
|
|-
|Win
| align=center|15–4
| Martin Chuděj 
|TKO (punches)
| RXF 27
| 
|align=center|2
|align=center|1:36
| Piatra Neamț, Romania
|
|-
|Win
| align=center|14–4
| John Painter
|TKO (punches)
| RXF 25: All Stars
| 
|align=center|1
|align=center|0:26
| Ploiești, Romania
|
|-
|Win
| align=center|13–4
| Papis Konez
|TKO (punches)
| RXF 24
| 
|align=center|1
|align=center|2:05
| Brasov, Romania
|
|-
|Loss
| align=center|12–4
| Michał Wlazło
|TKO (knees and punches)
| RXF 21: All Stars
| 
|align=center|2
|align=center|3:11
| Bucharest, Romania
|
|-
|Win
| align=center|12–3
| Mahmoud Hassan
|Submission (Von Flue choke)
| RXF 19
| 
|align=center|1
|align=center|2:43
| Galati, Romania
|
|-
|Win
| align=center|11–3
|Andrzej Kulik
|TKO (punches)
| RXF 18: Stanciu vs. Belbiță
| 
|align=center|1
|align=center|1:59
| Cluj-Napoca, Romania
| 
|-
| Win
| align=center|10–3
|Mighty Mo
| KO (punch)
| RXF 15: All Stars
| 
| align=center|1 
| align=center|4:05
| Bucharest, Romania
| 
|-
| Loss 
| align=center| 9–3
| Tomasz Czerwinski
| TKO (punches)
| RXF 12
| 
| align=center|1 
| align=center|4:25 
| Mamaia, Romania
| 
|-
| Win
| align=center| 9-2
| Steven Banks
| TKO (strikes)
| Local Kombat
| 
| align=center| 1
| align=center| N/A
| Onesti, Romania
| 
|-
| Win
| align=center| 8–2
| Chris Mahle
| Submission (arm-triangle choke)
| Gala MMA: Romania-Germany
| 
| align=center| 1
| align=center| 1:06
| Cluj Napoca, Romania
| 
|-
| Win
| align=center| 7–2
| Albert Sarkozi
| Submission (punches)
| Local Kombat Sibiu
| 
| align=center| 1
| align=center| 0:25
| Sibiu, Romania
| 
|-
| Win
| align=center| 6–2
| Jimmy Ambriz
| TKO (doctor stoppage)
| K-1 World Grand Prix 2010 in Bucharest – Europe GP
| 
| align=center| 2
| align=center| N/A
| Bucharest, Romania
| 
|-
| Loss
| align=center| 5–2
| Rastislav Talarovic
| TKO (punches)
| K-1 ColliZion 2009 Final  
| 
| align=center| 2
| align=center| 0:46
| Prague, Czech Republic
| 
|-
| Win
| align=center| 5–1
| Jesse Smith, Jr.
| Submission (smother choke)
| K-1 ColliZion 2009 Final Elimination
| 
| align=center| 1
| align=center| 0:51
| Arad, Romania
| 
|-
| Win
| align=center| 4–1
| Ruben Villareal
| Submission (smother choke)
| Local Kombat 33
| 
| align=center| 1
| align=center| 1:45
| Oradea, Romania
| 
|-
| Win
| align=center| 3–1
| Mark Bentley
| KO (punches)
| Strike MMA 3
| 
| align=center| 1
| align=center| 0:06
| Cluj-Napoca, Romania
| 
|-
| Win
| align=center| 2–1
| Tom Erikson
| KO (punches)
| Strike MMA 2
| 
| align=center| 1
| align=center| 1:21
| Mamaia, Romania
| 
|-
| Win
| align=center| 1–1
| Mark Buchanan
| Submission (kimura)
| Cage Rage 18
| 
| align=center| 1
| align=center| 1:55
| London, England
| 
|-
| Loss
| align=center| 0–1
| James Thompson
| TKO (punches)
| PRIDE 30
| 
| align=center| 1
| align=center| 2:13
| Saitama, Japan
|

Achievements

Lungu was also a multiple judo champion and gold medalist of Romania.

Personal life 
In 2015, his second wife gave birth to twins.

See also 
List of judoka
List of male mixed martial artists
List of K-1 events
List of male kickboxers

References

External links

 

1974 births
Living people
Romanian male judoka
Olympic judoka of Romania
Judoka at the 1996 Summer Olympics
Romanian male mixed martial artists
Super heavyweight mixed martial artists
Mixed martial artists utilizing judo
Romanian male kickboxers
Heavyweight kickboxers
People from Bihor County
Universiade medalists in judo
Universiade gold medalists for Romania
SUPERKOMBAT kickboxers
SUPERKOMBAT mixed martial artists
Medalists at the 1999 Summer Universiade